Karolína Erbanová (born 27 October 1992) is a Czech ice hockey player and retired long-track speed skater. She won a bronze medal at the 2018 Winter Olympics in the 500 m event in speed skating. She is a member of the Czech national ice hockey team and is signed with HPK Kiekkonaiset in the Naisten Liiga (NSML) for the 2022–23 season.

Speed skating career
As a child, Erbanová enjoyed cross-country skiing and played ice hockey from age 10. She was very fast on skates and, at 13, she was recommended by her ice hockey coach to NOVIS Team head coach Petr Novák as a prospect. The following year, she joined the NOVIS Team. It was initially predicted that she would be a middle-distance skater but she came to specialize in sprints instead.

Despite demonstrating an aptitude for shorter distance tracks, early in her career as a member of the NOVIS team Erbanová was obligated to skate the same events as her team leader, long-track skater Martina Sáblíková. During 2008 to 2012, she competed semi-frequently in 3000 m and occasionally in 5000 m, Sáblíková's best events.

Together with teammates Martina Sáblíková and Andrea Jirků, she won the overall team pursuit of the 2008–09 ISU Speed Skating World Cup. At the 2009 tournament of the World Junior Speed Skating Championships in Zakopane, she competed in the 3000 m  but was disqualified after forgetting to change lanes. In the following World Junior Championships in Moscow, she fell during the second 500 m race and lost the chance to medal.

During the 2012–13 season she won her first individual Senior World Cup in Harbin at the 1000 m.

On 27 August 2018, she announced her retirement from professional speed skating at the age of 25, citing the "manipulative, degrading and aggressive behavior" of Czech national speed-skating coach Petr Novák as the primary motivator.

Medal table
Major tournaments in bold.

Personal records

Speedskating results

Olympic Games
Erbanová represented the Czech Republic in speed skating at the Winter Olympics in 2010, 2014, and 2018. She competed in the 500 m and 1000 m speed skating events at all three Olympics and also in 1500 m speed skating events in 2010 and 2014. Her best finish was an Olympic bronze in the 500 m event at the 2018 Winter Olympics.

World Single Distance Championships
Erbanová participated in seven World Single Distances Speed Skating Championships for Women. Her best finish was bronze in the 1000 m at the 2015 World Single Distance Speed Skating Championships.

World Allround Championships
Erbanová participated in two World Allround Speed Skating Championships. She did not qualify for the 5000 m at either championship and was therefore unable to contest for an allround medal. Her highest finish in a single event was second in the 500 m at the 2011 World Allround Speed Skating Championships.

World Sprint Championships
Erbanová participated in five World Sprint Speed Skating Championships for Women. Her best allround finish was bronze at the 2015 World Sprint Speed Skating Championships – Women.

European Championships
The European Speed Skating Championships for Women were contested as an allround comprising 500 m, 1500 m, 3000 m,  5000 m events until 2017. The 2017 European Speed Skating Championships was the first instance in which the traditional allround and sprint allround were contested at a single tournament, with medalists in both allround and sprint. The 2018 European Speed Skating Championships were the first instance in which the European Championship comprised single distances, neither sprint nor allround were contested.

Allround 
Erbanová's best allround finish was ninth in 2010. She placed first in the 500 m event in 2010, 2011, 2012, and 2013.

Sprint

Single distances

World Junior Championships
Erbanová participated in four World Junior Speed Skating Championships. Her best allround finish was gold in 2011, at age 18, and she also won medals in 2010 and 2012, bronze and silver respectively.

National Championships

World Cup
Legend:
 did not start = "–"
 distance was not held = "x"
 did not finish = "dnf"
 MS = "mass start"

References

External links
 
 
 

1992 births
Living people
Czech expatriate ice hockey players in Finland
Czech expatriate ice hockey players in Sweden
Czech female speed skaters
Czech women's ice hockey forwards
HPK Kiekkonaiset players
Medalists at the 2018 Winter Olympics
Olympic bronze medalists for the Czech Republic
Olympic medalists in speed skating
Olympic speed skaters of the Czech Republic
People from Vrchlabí
Speed skaters at the 2010 Winter Olympics
Speed skaters at the 2014 Winter Olympics
Speed skaters at the 2018 Winter Olympics
Sportspeople from the Hradec Králové Region
World Single Distances Speed Skating Championships medalists
World Sprint Speed Skating Championships medalists